Polypedates pseudocruciger (common names: false hour-glass tree frog or yellow tree frog) is a species of frog in the family Rhacophoridae endemic to the southern Western Ghats, India. It is a common and widespread frog. It is an arboreal edge habitat species generally associated with the understorey of tropical, moist evergreen forest. It breeds in small temporary ponds. Eggs are laid on a leaf over the pond.

Polypedates pseudocruciger can also occur in disturbed habitats close to human habitations, but severe habitat degradation is a threat to this species.

References

External links

pseudocruciger
Frogs of India
Endemic fauna of the Western Ghats
Taxonomy articles created by Polbot
Amphibians described in 1998